Unseeded Nancy Gunter won the singles title of the 1972 Virginia Slims of Washington tennis tournament, defeating second-seeded Chris Evert in the final 7–6(5–1), 6–2. The competition was played on indoor carpet courts at the Linden Hill Racquet Club in Bethesda, Maryland.

Seeds

  Billie Jean King (first round)
  Chris Evert (final)
  Rosie Casals (semifinals)
  Françoise Dürr (quarterfinals)
  Kerry Melville (semifinals)
  Judy Dalton (first round)
  Wendy Overton (quarterfinals)
  Helen Gourlay (first round)

Draw

References

Virginia Slims of Washington
Virginia Slims of Washington
1972 in sports in Washington, D.C.
Virginia Slims of Washington